Luis René Alicea de Jesús (born July 29, 1965) is a former Major League Baseball second baseman and coach.

Alicea played for the Kansas City Royals, Texas Rangers, Anaheim Angels, St. Louis Cardinals and Boston Red Sox. He played college baseball for the Florida State University Seminoles with his brother Edwin under head coach Mike Martin.

Alicea played 13 seasons, during which he played in 1,341 games.  He was a career .260 hitter, with 47 home runs and 422 runs batted in. He had a lifetime .346 on-base percentage, and a .369 slugging percentage.  He ranked in the top 5 in triples three times in his career (1992, 1997, 2000).

In 12 career postseason games, Alicea batted .267, with a .371 on-base percentage.

St. Louis Cardinals
He was drafted by the St. Louis Cardinals in the first round (23rd pick) of the 1986 amateur draft. He made his major league debut in a 12–9 Cardinals loss to the New York Mets on April 23, 1988. Starting at second base and batting eighth, Alicea went 1-for-4 with a triple, a walk and a run scored in his debut. He hit .212 with one home run and 24 RBI in 93 games with the Cardinals that season.

Boston Red Sox
On December 7, 1994, he was traded to the Boston Red Sox for Jeff McNeely and Nate Minchey. He played one season with the Red Sox, batting .270 with six homers and 44 RBI. Alicea was one of a few Boston players to perform well in the  American League Division Series against the Cleveland Indians. He hit .600 (6-for-10) with a double and home run as the Red Sox were swept in three games.

St. Louis Cardinals, second stint
Alicea was waived by the Red Sox, returning to the Cardinals on a one-year, $500,000 contract on March 19, 1996. He hit .258 with five home runs and 42 RBI in 129 games for St. Louis.

Anaheim Angels
In January , Alicea signed a one-year deal with the Anaheim Angels, taking over at second base for Randy Velarde. In 128 games with the Angels, Alicea hit .253 with five home runs and 37 RBI, stealing a career-high 22 bases.

Texas Rangers
In December 1997, Alicea signed a two-year, $1.5 million deal with the Texas Rangers. In his first season in Texas, Alicea hit .274 with six home runs and 33 RBI in 101 games. In , he hit .201 with three homers and 17 RBI in 68 games with the Rangers.

It was in  that he had his best season establishing career highs with a .294 average, 85 runs, 159 hits, and 63 RBI.

Kansas City Royals
He played his last two seasons with the Kansas City Royals before retiring following the  season. In , Alicea hit .274 with four home runs and 32 RBI in 113 games. In his final big league campaign, he hit .228 with a homer and 23 RBI in 94 games.

Coaching career

On November 29, 2006, Alicea was named by the Red Sox as their first base coach, taking over for Bill Haselman.

Alicea was then hired by the New York Mets to be their first base coach for the  season. On October 5, 2009, after the Mets' dismal 70–92 season, they announced that Alicea would not return to the Mets coaching staff in the 2010 season.

See also
 List of Major League Baseball players from Puerto Rico

References

External links
, or Retrosheet

   

1965 births
Living people
Anaheim Angels players
Arkansas Travelers players
Boston Red Sox coaches
Boston Red Sox players
Greenville Drive managers
Erie Cardinals players
Florida State Seminoles baseball players
Kansas City Royals players
Louisville Redbirds players
Lowell Spinners managers
Major League Baseball first base coaches
Major League Baseball players from Puerto Rico
Major League Baseball second basemen
New York Mets coaches
New York Mets players
St. Louis Cardinals players
St. Petersburg Cardinals players
Texas Rangers players
Sportspeople from San Juan, Puerto Rico
All-American college baseball players
Anchorage Glacier Pilots players